The Northfield Mountain Tailrace Tunnel is a tunnel linking the Northfield Mountain pumped-storage hydroelectric facility to the Connecticut River in Millers Falls, Massachusetts.

References 
 Northeast Generation Company SEC Filing, 12/6/01

Aqueducts in Massachusetts
Transportation buildings and structures in Franklin County, Massachusetts